Reverend James Henry Savory (1855-1903) was an English clergyman, a Double Blue at Oxford University, a first-class cricketer, and an FA Cup finalist in football.

Life
Baptised at Binfield on 15 April 1855, only son of the Reverend Edmund Savory (1825-1912) and his wife Diana Maria Randall, he was educated at  Winchester College and from 1874 at Trinity College, Oxford, gaining a MA in 1885. In 1886, he was appointed vicar of Little Dalby in Leicestershire. From 1896, he was chaplain of the chapel on the Bayham Abbey estate, being recorded there in the 1901 census. Probate of his will was granted to his widow on 31 August 1903.

Cricket career
He played for his school, Winchester College, in 1873 and 1874, and then at university for his college, Trinity. Picked for the University team, he played in the Varsity Match against Cambridge in 1877 and 1878. Other first-class teams he played for were MCC, A.W. Ridley's XI, and Gentlemen of England. He also batted for Harlequins, Old Wykehamists, and finally Free Foresters, for whom he last turned out in 1893.

Football career
At university, he qualified for the Oxford University team, who were runners-up in the 1876-77 FA Cup.

Family
On 25 February 1886 at Thornton, Buckinghamshire, he married Amy (1859-1929), second daughter of the Reverend Herbert Richard Peel and his wife Georgiana Maria, daughter of the Reverend Thomas Baker. His wife's older sister, Alice, married Arthur Howard Heath. With Amy he had two daughters, Gladys Rebe Savory (1887-1947) and Ethel Mary Savory (1888-1958), who did not marry.

References

External links

1855 births
1903 deaths
People from Binfield
People educated at Winchester College
Alumni of Trinity College, Oxford
English cricketers
Oxford University cricketers
19th-century English Anglican priests
Marylebone Cricket Club cricketers
People from Lamberhurst
A. W. Ridley's XI cricketers
Gentlemen of England cricketers
FA Cup Final players
Association footballers not categorized by position
Association football players not categorized by nationality